Giakaibii is a settlement in Nyeri County of Central Province, Kenya. As of the 2019 census it had a population of 1,971 across 624 households.

References 

Populated places in Central Province (Kenya)